Damias calida is a moth of the family Erebidae first described by Francis Walker in 1865. It is found on Sulawesi, Seram and in New Guinea.

References

Damias
Moths described in 1865